Guksu can have several meanings:

 Guksu, a Go competition in South Korea
 Guksu (dish), the generic term for Korean noodles
 Guksu can mean Kuksu and is a native California spirit and religion